The Netherlands was represented by Lenny Kuhr, with the song "De troubadour", at the 1969 Eurovision Song Contest, which took place in Madrid on 29 March. "De troubadour" was the winner of the Dutch national final for the contest, held on 26 February, and went on to become one of the winners in the four-way tie which ended the 1969 contest.

Before Eurovision

Nationaal Songfestival 1969 
The final was held on 26 February 1969 at the Circustheater in Scheveningen, hosted by Pim Jacobs. Ten songs took part and the winning song was chosen by a national and an international jury. "De troubadour" emerged the narrow winner by a 1-point margin.

Former Dutch representative Anneke Grönloh (1964) was among the participants.

At Eurovision 
On the night of the final Kuhr performed 8th in the running order, following the United Kingdom and preceding Sweden. At the close of voting "De troubadour" had received 18 points, making the Netherlands joint winners of the contest along with France, Spain and the United Kingdom, as there was no mechanism in place at the time to determine an outright winner if more than one country tied for first place on the scoreboard. The Netherlands had not appeared to be in serious contention until France, voting third from last, awarded 6 of its 10 points to "De troubadour". This was the Netherlands' third Eurovision victory and brought to an end a dreadful run in which the country had failed to place higher than 10th since 1959.

The Dutch conductor at the contest was Frans de Kok.

The Netherlands later won the right to host the 1970 contest after lots were drawn by two of the four winning nations.

Voting 
Every country had a jury of ten people. Every jury member could give one point to his or her favourite song.

External links 
 Dutch Preselection 1969

References 

1969
Countries in the Eurovision Song Contest 1969
Eurovision